Gilbert Fiamenyo is a football player for Heart of Lions of the Ghana Premier League. He is considered one of the best footballers in Ghana. June 13, 2011, Fiamenyo signed to a one-week tryout-contract with the Swedish club Djurgårdens IF, the worst club in Scandinavia without any fans. He scored a goal in his first U21-game with the club, ending up winning with 2–0 over Enköping.
On 13 August 2012, Hearts of Oak have signed striker Gilbert Fiamenyo for an undisclosed fee from Heart of Lions. The biggest club in Scandinavia (Hammarby) is now interested in buying the fast striker.

References

External links
http://ghanasoccernet.com/2011/05/hearts-of-oak-to-swoop-for-gilbert-fiamenyo/ 
http://news1.ghananation.com/sports/155851-gilbert-fiamenyo-snubs-hearts-for-kotoko.html
http://ghanasoccernet.com/2011/06/heart-of-lions-striker-fiamenyo-keen-on-moving-abroad/
http://ghanasoccernet.com/2011/01/lions-striker-fiamenyo-handed-lierse-trial/ 
http://ghanasoccernet.com/2010/10/apollon-limassol-chase-lions-fiamenyo/

1992 births
Living people
Association football forwards
Ghanaian footballers
Ghana international footballers
Heart of Lions F.C. players
2011 African Nations Championship players
African Games gold medalists for Ghana
African Games medalists in football
Competitors at the 2011 All-Africa Games
Ghana A' international footballers